Robert Olson or Olsen may refer to:

Robert A. Olson (1917–1987), American soil scientist and educator
Robert E. Olson (1919–2011), American nutrition scientist and physician
Robert W. Olson (1920–2013), Seventh-day Adventist theologian
Robert S. Olson (born 1969), Republican member of the Kansas Senate
 Lute Olson (Robert Luther Olson, born 1934), American basketball coach

See also
Robert Olsson (1883–1954), Swedish hammer thrower